Mariano Díaz is a Dominican footballer.

Mariano Díaz may also refer to:
Mariano Díaz (photographer) (born 1929), Venezuelan photographer
Mariano Díaz (cyclist) (born 1939), Spanish cyclist

See also
Mariano Dias (born 1960), Indian footballer
Mariana Díaz (disambiguation)